Gongylocarpus is a genus of flowering plants belonging to the family Onagraceae.

Its native range is Mexico to Guatemala.

Species:

Gongylocarpus fruticulosus 
Gongylocarpus rubricaulis

References

Onagraceae
Onagraceae genera